List of Bhojpuri films created across the world.

1960s
Ganga Maiyya Tohe Piyari Chadhaibo (1962)
Bidesiya (1965)
Laagi Naahi Chhute Rama (1963)
Sita Maiya (1964)

1980s 
Aanchara Ke Laaj
Aangan Ke Laxmi (1986)
Babua Hamar
Bahina Tohare Khatir
Bahuria
Bairi Kangana (1983)
Bairi Sawan
Baje Shahanai Hamar Angna
Balma Nadan
Bansuriya Baje Ganga Teer (1984)
Bhaiya
Bhaiya Dooj
Bihari Babu (1985)
Biraha Ki Raat
Bitiya Bhail Sayan
Bitiya Chalal Sasural
Chanwa Ke Take Chakor (1981)
Chukti Bhar Senur (1983)
Dagabaaz Balama (1988)
Dharati Ki Aawaz
Dharti Maiya (1981)
Dulha Ganga Paar Ke (1986)
Dulhin
Gaajab Bhaile Rama
Ganga Aabad Rakhih Sajanwa Ke
Ganga Aur Gauri
Ganga Ghat
Ganga Hamar Mai
Ganga Jaisan Bhauji Hamar (1986)
Ganga Jwala (1987)
Ganga Ke Teere Teere
Ganga Ki Beti
Ganga Kinare Mora Gaon (1983)
Ganga Maiya Bhar da Aacharawa Hamar
Ganga Maiya Kar Da MilanawA Hamar
Ganga Maiya Tohar Kiriya
Ganga Sarayu
Garakh Nath Baba Tohe Khichari Charaibo
Ghar Grihasthi
Ghayal Piyawa
Godana
Hamar Bhauji (1983)
Hamar Dulha (1989)
Hausala
Jaha Bahe Ganga Dhar
Jai Bhawani
Jai Ma Vindhyawasini
Krishna Kanhaiya
Lagal Chunari Me Daag (1988)
Mai (1989)
Mai Ka Aanchara
Maibha Mahatari
Naihar Ke Chunari
Nautankee
Paan Khaye Saiyan Hamaar (1984)
Paijaniya
Paijaniyan
Parbatiya Banal Panditaina
Patna Ke Babu
Patoh Bitiya
Phoolwa Se Bharad Aacharawa Hamar
Phoolwari
 Piya Ke Gaon (1985)
Piya Ke Pyari
Piya Nirmohiya
Piya Rakhih Senurawa Ke Laj
Piya Tootena Piritiya Hamar
Pritam More Ganga Teere
Pyari Dulhania
Ram Jaisan Bhaiya Hamar
Roos Gailen Saiyen Hamaar (1988)
Sach Bhaile Sapanwa Hamar
 Saiyan Magan Pahelwani Mein (1981)
Saiya Bina Ghar Soona
Saiya Se Neh Lagaibe
Saiyan Tore Karan (1981)
Sajai Da Mang Hamar
Sajanwa Bairi Bhaile Hamar
Sampurna Teerth Yatra
Senoor
Senurwa Bhail Mohal
Sonwa Ka Pinjara
Sohag Bindiya (1986)
Thakurain
Tikuli Ke Laaj
Tulsi Sohen Hamar Aangana (1986)

1990s 
Baba Ke luari
Babuni
Champa Chameli
Dhania Munia
Ganga Maiya Bhar da Godiya Hamar
Ganga Mile Gagar Me
Ganga Se Jata Ba Hamar
Ganga Tori Mamta Mahan
Hamaar Sajnaa
Hamar Betwa
He Tulsi Maiya (1992)
Jug Jug Jiya More Laal
Kaisan Banaula Sansar
Kajaree
Kasam Ganga Jal Ke
Muniaa
Pyara Bhaiya
Rangali Chunaria Rang Me Tohar
Saat Phere (1996)
Nehiya Lagvani Saiyan Se (1995)

2000
Dilhin Bani Mor Bahiniya

2002
 Tohar Pyaar Chahi
 Pujiha Charan Mai Baap Ke
 Sathi Sanghatee

2003 
Maai Re Karde Bidaai Hamaar
Saiyaan Hamaar
Hamra Se Biyah Karba
Maai Baap
Kanyadaan
Sasura Bada Paisawala

2004 
Coolie
Daroga Babu I Love You
Humke Mafi Dei Da
Durga Banli Kali
Rangli Chunariya Tohre Naam Ki
Sohagan Bana De Sajna Hamaar
Ghar Dwaar
Pandit Ji Batai Na Biyah Kab Hoi
Kab Hoi Milanwa Hamar

2005 
Nadiya Ke Teer
Bandhan Toote Na
Hum Hai Bal Bramachari Tu Kanyakunwari
Dulha Milal Dildar
Hum Toh Ho Gayi Tohar
Raja

2006-2009 
Balma 420
Bandhan Toote Na
Bhaiya Ke Sasurari Me
Bidesiya
Chhodab Na Sang Tohaar
Deswa
Devarji
Dharti Kahe Pukaar ke
Firangi Dulhniya
Sabse Bada Mujrim
Dil
Gabbarsingh
Gangotri
Ghar- Duaar
Halkat Hai Saiyaan Fir Bhi Madhuri Dulhaniya
Hamri Kokh
Hum Bal Brahamachari Tu Kanyakunwari
Janam Janam Ke Saath
Kahiya Doli Leke Aiba
Kanoon Hamra Mutthi Main
Lagal Raha E Rajaji
Lahariya Luta E Rajaji
Maati (2007)
Nirahua Rickshawwala
  Khiladi No. 1   (2008)
Nirahuaa NO. 1
Pappu Ke Pyaar ho Gayeel
Parivaar
Pratigya
Pyaar Ke Bandhan
Rang De Basanti Chola (2008)
Saat Saheliyan
Sasura Bada Paisawala
Saugandh Ganga Maiya Ke
Tu Hi Mor Baalma
Saajan Chale Sasural
URAL
Tohse Pyar ba

2010
Devra Bada Satawela

2011
Deswa
Elaan

2012
 Sajan Chale Sasuraal

2013
 Dubbed movies
Rajkumar
Tohara Ke Thok Deb

2014 

Nirahua Hindustani
Adalat
Aurat Khilona Nahi
Baazigar
Bedardi Balma
Bitiya Sada Suhaghan Rah
Charnon Ki Saugandh
Chhapra Ke Prem Kahani
Dariya Dil
Deewangi Had Se
Dil Lagal Dupatta Wali Se
Ek Laila Teen Chhaila
Nirahua Ek Sarfira
Ham Ke Daru Naahi Mehraru Chaahi
Hathkadi
Hunterwali
Insaf Ke Devi
Inspector Chandani
Jab Pyar Kiya To Darna Kya
Jaaneman
Jo Jeeta Wohi Sikandar
Jaan Lebu Ka Ho
Kachche Dhaage
Kare La Kamaal Dharti Ke Lal
Katta Tanal Dupatta Par
Khoon Bhari Hamar Maang
Laadla
Maine Dil Tujhko Diya
Nagina
Pratigya 2
Pyaar Hoke Rahi
Pyar Mohabbat Zindabad
Raja Ji I Love You
Saiyya Ji Dilwa Mangelein
Sajna Mangiya Sajai Da Hamar
Shola Shabanam
Tere Naam
Thok Deb
Villain Ek Prem Kahani
Yoddha

2015
Baaj Gail Danka
Bagawat
Patna Se Pakistan
Bin Bajawa Sapera
Daroga Chale Sasuraal
Dil Aur Deewar
Dulara
Hero No.1
Jaan Tere Liye
Lagi Naahi Chhute Rama
Lagi Tohse Lagan
Maai Ke Karz
Pandit Ji Batai Na Biyah Kab Hoi 2
Prashashan
Rakht Boomi
Saajan Ki Bahon Mein
Saiyan Jigarbaaz
Teri Meri Aashiqui
Tohse Lagal Piritiya Hamaar

2016
Babua
Baghi Bhaile Sajna Hamaar
 Ballia Ke Dabangai
Dulhan Chahi Pakistan Se
Tridev
Truck Driver 2
Mokama 0 km
Aashik Aawara
Bam Bam Bol Raha Hai Kashi
Nirahua Chalal Sasural 2
Aakhiri Rasta
Ram Lakhan

2017
Beta Hokhe Ta Aisan
Mehandi Laga Ke Rakhna
Mai Sehra Bandh Ke Aaunga
Yodhaa Arjun Pandit
Aatankwadi
Sarkar Raj
Jila Champaran
Nirahu Satal Rahe
Satya
Hum Hai Hindustani
Tere Jaisa Yaar Kahan
Jigar
Sipahi
Tabadala
Muqaddar
Challenge
Nirahua Hindustani 2
Kasam Paida Karne Wale Ki
Dhadkan
Kashi Amarnath
Arjun with Mayur Kumar & Shreya Mishra

2018

2019

2020

2021

2020s 

List of Bhojpuri films of 2022
List of Bhojpuri films of 2023

See also 
 Bhojpuri cinema
 List of Bhojpuri actors
 List of Bhojpuri actresses
 List of Bhojpuri singers
 Cinema of Bihar

References

External links
 List of Bhojpuri films on IMDB
 https://m.khaskhabar.com/news/bollywood-news-bhojpuri-film-bairy-suratiya-teaser-released-news-hindi-1-445183-KKN.html

Cinema of Bihar
Bhojpuri cinema
Lists of Indian films
Bhojpuri